Local World Holdings Ltd. was a large regional newspaper publisher in the UK that published around 100 print titles and more than 70 websites. It was formed in 2012 by David Montgomery, a former chief executive of Trinity Mirror, to buy the Daily Mail and General Trust's Northcliffe Media business, and the Yattendon Group's Iliffe newspaper group.

In October 2015 Trinity Mirror, now Reach plc, bought the company. The sale was completed on 13 November 2015. In April 2017 the Local World website started redirecting to the Trinity Mirror website.

History
Local World was established in 2012 by David Montgomery, in order to purchase local newspaper businesses. 

In November 2012, it was announced that it would purchase Northcliffe Media from Daily Mail and General Trust, and separately, the Iliffe newspaper group from the Yattendon Group. The purchase of the businesses was approved by the Office of Fair Trading on 28 June 2013.

In September 2015, Daily Mail and General Trust confirmed it had entered into talks to sell Local World to Trinity Mirror; the sale was completed the following month.

Titles

Local World

Iliffe News and Media titles
Cambridge News 
Hertfordshire Mercury
Herts & Essex Observer
Harlow Star
The Advertiser
Bedfordshire on Sunday
Dunstable on Sunday
Leighton Buzzard on Sunday
Luton on Sunday
OneMK (Milton Keynes)
Burton Mail
Staffordshire Newsletter
Ashbourne News Telegraph
Uttoxeter Advertiser
Black Country Bugle
Your Leek Paper
Nuneaton News
Staffordshire Life

Websites
Kent Live

References

Daily Mail and General Trust
 
Reach plc
Newspaper companies of the United Kingdom
2012 establishments in England